Rick Sentes (born January 10, 1947 in Regina, Saskatchewan) is a retired professional ice hockey player who played 337 games in the World Hockey Association.  He played with the Ottawa Nationals, Toronto Toros, San Diego Mariners, and Calgary Cowboys.

Awards
 CMJHL First All-Star Team – 1967

External links 

1947 births
Calgary Cowboys players
Canadian ice hockey right wingers
Ottawa Nationals players
Toronto Toros players
San Diego Mariners players
Living people
Ice hockey people from Saskatchewan
Sportspeople from Regina, Saskatchewan